David Lowe also known as "Uncle Art" is a British composer known for his work on computer games from 1985 to 1998.

Lowe got attention by making music with professional synthesizers (CX5, DX7, RX11 drum machine) for an additional cassette tape distributed with the games Starglider 2 and Carrier Command.

His Starglider soundtrack for 16-bit computers (ST & Amiga) was also notable of having 15-second long song (a single sound file) with vocals and synthesizers on both versions. Amiga version's title music used high quality instrument sounds (for then prevailing standards - before tracker music).

Lowe composed and recorded the music for Frontier: Elite II.

Lowe was also co author and assembler programmer for 'Buggy Blast' and also programmer for the Spectrum Z80 version of 'Thrust': both published by Rainbird 1985 & 1986 respectively. In 2017, Lowe and his daughter finished their latest album; A Temporal Shift. It features remastered versions of some of Lowe's best-known gaming tunes.

Notable games
Buggy Blast (1985, ZX Spectrum)
Rasputin (1986, ZX Spectrum)
Rad-Zone (1986, Amstrad CPC)Thrust (1986, ZX Spectrum)Starglider (1987, ZX Spectrum, Amstrad CPC, Atari ST, Amiga)Carrier Command (1988, ZX Spectrum, Amstrad CPC, audio tape music)Exceleron (1988, Commodore 64)Games, The: Summer Edition (Go For Gold) (1988, Amiga, Atari ST)Galaxy Force (1988, Amiga, Atari ST)Starglider 2 (1988, Amiga, audio tape music)International Karate + (1988, Amiga, Atari ST) (Based on Rob Hubbard's original for the Commodore 64)After Burner II (1988, Amiga, Atari ST arranged from the arcade game)P47 Thunderbolt (1988, Commodore 64)Xain'd Sleena aka Soldier of Light (1988, Amiga)Altered Beast (1989, Amiga, Atari ST)Bangkok Knights (1989, Amiga, Atari ST)Darius+ (1989, Amiga, Atari ST)Double Dragon II (1989, Commodore 64)F-15 Strike Eagle II (1989, Amiga, Atari ST)Garfield: A Winter's Tail (1989, Commodore 64, Amiga, Atari ST)Hard Drivin' (1989, C64)Power Drift (1989, ZX Spectrum, Amstrad CPC, MSX, Commodore 64, Amiga, Atari ST)Raffles (Devon Aire in the Hidden Diamond Caper) / (Inside Outing) (1989, Amiga, Atari ST)Time Scanner (1989, Amiga, Atari ST)ISS: Incredible Shrinking Sphere (1989, Amiga)Betrayal (1990, Commodore 64, Amiga, Atari ST)Ghostbusters II (1990, Amiga, Atari ST)Line of Fire (1990, Commodore 64, Amiga, Atari ST)Night Shift (1990, Commodore 64, Amiga, Atari ST)Railroad Tycoon (1990, Amiga)Turbo Outrun (1990, home ports, credited as "Uncle Art")Black Hornet (1991, Amiga, Atari ST)Cyber Police ESWAT (1991, Commodore 64, Amiga, Atari ST)Elite Plus (1991 DOS)Final Fight (1991, Commodore 64, Atari ST) (based on original by Yoko Shimomura)Midwinter II: Flames of Freedom (1991, Atari ST)Formula One Grand Prix (1992, Amiga, Atari ST)Pinball Dreams (1992, DOS, based on original by Olof Gustafsson)Streetfighter II (1992, Commodore 64, Amiga, Atari ST) (based on original by Yoko Shimomura)Frontier: Elite II (1993, Amiga)Cybermorph (1993, Atari Jaguar)PGA Tour Golf & PGA Tour Golf II (1993, Sega Game Gear)Beneath a Steel Sky (1994, Amiga, Amiga CD32)The Misadventures of Flink (1994, Mega Drive cartridge) (based on original by Matthias Steinwachs)Frontier: First Encounters'' (1995, DOS)

External links
Archived version of David's official Uncle Art Music website
David Lowes music files on Exotica
Overview of Lowe's Amiga music at Mobygames
David Lowe interview in Sinclair User 57
David's daughter Holly's official website

British composers
Video game composers
Year of birth missing (living people)
Living people